The Insertion sequence IS1222 ribosomal frameshifting element is an RNA element found in the insertion sequence IS222. The ribosomal frameshifting element stimulates frameshifting which is known to be required for transposition.

References

External links 
 

Cis-regulatory RNA elements